Square Up is the first Korean extended play (second overall) by South Korean girl group Blackpink, released on June 15, 2018 by YG Entertainment. It is available in two versions and contains four tracks, with "Ddu-Du Ddu-Du" released as the lead single. "Ddu-Du Ddu-Du" peaked at number one in South Korea for three weeks and became the highest-charting song by a female K-pop act in the United States and United Kingdom. The song "Forever Young" was later promoted in Korean music programs and peaked at number two in South Korea.

Upon its release, Square Up debuted atop the Gaon Album Chart and went on to sell almost 179,000 copies on its first fifteen days of release in South Korea. The EP also debuted at number 40 on the US Billboard 200, becoming Blackpink's highest selling album in a Western market as well as the highest-charting album by a female K-pop group at the time. It was certified Platinum by the Korea Music Content Association (KMCA) in March 2019 for selling 250,000 units, and was later certified 2× Platinum in March 2023 for selling 500,000 units.

Background and release
On April 24, 2018, YG Entertainment founder Yang Hyun-suk raised expectations of the group's comeback via SNS stating that by the end of this year Blackpink will return with new music soon. And on May 17, he revealed the month of June for the release while answering fan asked questions on SNS. An official news report revealed that the mini album would be released on June 15.

On June 1, the album's moving poster was unveiled, followed by the full track list on June 5 and an individual moving poster of the members, teasing audio of "Ddu-Du Ddu-Du" and "Forever Young". Subsequently, from June 12 to 14, the album's teaser posters were released.

On June 14, a teaser of the music video for "Ddu-Du Ddu-Du" was released on both Blackpink's official YouTube channel and the group's official V Live channel. On June 15, the mini album was released, along with the music video for "Ddu-Du Ddu-Du".

Composition

Songs
The opening track "Ddu-Du Ddu-Du" is a "fierce" hip-hop and pop rap song with bubblegum pop sound and trap beat. It combines instrumentations of oriental percussion rhythms and whistling on top of the bassline. Lyrically, the song is an anthem about the group's success and self-confidence, based around the hook of "Hit you with that ddu-du ddu-du du". The second track "Forever Young" is a mid-tempo "beachy", moombahton-based dance track with "lasering" house beats and reggaeton swing. The lyrics talk about how they celebrate making the most of your youth, while saying "Blackpink is the revolution". The third track "Really" is a "chill" hip-pop and R&B song about pleading with a lover to show him how much they care. The closing track "See U Later" is a "cutting breakup" dance-pop song that mixes pop and hip-hop with a "trap-laden" chorus, "reminiscent" guitar sound and the distortion 808 bass.

Promotion

On the afternoon of June 15, Blackpink held a press conference for the release of "Square Up" at M-CUBE, Sinsa-dong, Seoul. On the same day, one hour prior to the mini album's release a countdown special live was broadcast on Naver's V LIVE broadcasting site featuring Blackpink discussing the new music. It garnered over 850,000 viewers. On June 16, "Blackpink Area", a Square Up concept pop-up store was made public to the fans, at the same location where Blackpink House was filmed, for 9 days. On June 23, the group appeared as guests on JTBC's Idol Room to promote the EP, making their debut on the show.

Blackpink held their comeback stage on MBC's Show! Music Core on June 16 and on SBS's Inkigayo on June 17 featuring performances of both the lead single "Ddu-Du Ddu-Du" and the second single "Forever Young", and further continued promoting on various music programs in Korea. On July 14, the group finished promotions for "Ddu-Du Ddu-Du" and started promoting "Forever Young" as the second single from the EP and wrapped up their seven week long promotion on August 5 after performing on Inkigayo.

On August 17, it was announced that similar to "Blackpink Area", another pop-up store at BOK Gallery, Takeshita Street in Harajuku, Japan will be made public from August 22–26.

Critical reception

Square Up received generally favorable reviews from critics. Chase McMullen, writing for The 405, praised the album's "readymade hooks and airtight, bursting sonics" and its ability to go "from confrontational to blissfully ecstatic at the drop of a hat", proving Blackpink's mettle in the global K-pop boom. Billboard listed Square Up as the twentieth best K-pop album of 2018, describing it as "a testament to their dedication to rambunctious, hip-hop infused dance music" that "[exuded] confidence, sass and an overpowering sense of chic." Refinery29 placed Square Up at number 8 at their best K-pop albums of 2018, saying that it "shimmers with signature Blackpink cheekiness and effortless swagger, momentarily satiating the fans who are waiting for more."

Awards and nominations

Commercial performance
In South Korea, the mini album debuted at number one on Gaon Albums Chart, while “Ddu-Du Ddu-Du” debuted at number 3 on the Gaon Digital Chart and at number one on the Gaon Download Chart on the chart issue dated June 10–16, 2018 with 31,072,049 digital points. In its second week, "Ddu-Du Ddu-Du" peaked at number one on Digital, Download, Streaming, and Mobile Charts on Gaon with 85,411,467 digital points.

The mini album debuted on the top spot of Japan's Oricon Weekly Digital Albums chart with 3,915 downloads. The lead single "Ddu-Du Ddu-Du" debuted as the highest-charting Hot 100 hit ever by an all-female K-pop act, opening at number 55 with 12.4 million US streams and 7,000 downloads sold in the tracking week ending June 21, 2018, according to Nielsen Music, also entering on the US Streaming Songs tally at number 39, where Blackpink became the first K-pop girl group to chart a title. The single also sat atop Billboard World Digital Songs, making it the group's fourth number one song on the chart. Square Up also brought the group their first entry on the US Billboard 200, debuting at number 40 with 14,000 album-equivalent units. The mini album also topped the Billboard World Albums chart.

Track listing

Charts

Weekly charts

Monthly charts

Year-end charts

Certifications

|}

Release history

See also
 List of certified albums in South Korea
 List of Gaon Album Chart number ones of 2018
 List of K-pop albums on the Billboard charts

References

2018 EPs
Blackpink EPs
Korean-language EPs
YG Entertainment EPs
Genie Music EPs